Thomas David Oakland (November 23, 1939 – March 4, 2015) was an American school and educational psychologist who taught at the University of Florida from 1995 until retiring in 2010. He previously taught at the University of Texas at Austin for 27 years. He was a fellow of the American Psychological Society and of four divisions of the American Psychological Association.

References

Further reading

1939 births
2015 deaths
University of Florida faculty
Educational psychologists
20th-century American psychologists
University of Texas at Austin faculty
Indiana University alumni
People from Kenosha, Wisconsin
Fellows of the Association for Psychological Science